Heat transfer enhancement is the process of increasing the effectiveness of heat exchangers. This can be achieved when the heat transfer power of a given device is increased or when the pressure losses generated by the device are reduced. A variety of techniques can be applied to this effect, including generating strong secondary flows or increasing boundary layer turbulence.

Principle 

During the earliest attempts to enhance heat transfer, plain (or smooth) surfaces were used. This surface requires a special surface geometry able to provide higher  values per unit surface area in comparison with a plain surface. Thus,

 

The heat transfer rate for a two-fluid counterflow heat exchanger is given by

 

In order to better illustrate the benefits of enhancement, the total length 'L' of the tube is multiplied and divided in the equation

 

Where  is the overall thermal resistance per unit tube length. And it is given by

 

The subscripts 1 and 2, describe the two different fluids. The surface efficiency is represented by  employing extended surfaces.
One aspect to take into consideration is that the latter equation does not include any fouling resistances due to its simplicity, which can be important. In order to enhance the performance of the heat exchanger, the term,  must be increased.
For achieving a reduced thermal resistance, the enhanced surface geometry may be used to increase one or both terms  in relation to the plain surfaces, leading to a reduced thermal resistance per unit tube length, . This reduced term may be used to achieve one of the following three objectives:

1.  Size reduction. maintaining the heat exchange rate   constant, the length of the heat exchanger may be reduced, providing a heat exchanger of smaller proportions.

2.  Increased  . 
 Reduced : maintaining both   and the length constant,  can be reduced increasing thermodynamic process efficiency leading to reduced operation costs.
 Increased heat exchange: Increasing  and keeping a constant length will lead to an increased  for fixed fluid inlet temperature. 
3.  Reduced pumping power for fixed heat duty. This will require smaller velocities of operation than the plain surface and a normally not desired, increased frontal area.

Depending on the objectives for the design, any of the three different performance improvements can be used on an enhanced surface, and using any of the three mentioned performance improvements it is fully possible to accomplish it.

Internal flow

There are several available options for enhancing heat transfer. The enhancement can be achieved by increasing the surface area for convection or/and increasing the convection coefficient. For example, the surface roughness can be used to increase  in order to enhance turbulence. This can be achieved through machining or other kinds of insertions like coil-spring wire. The insert provides a helical roughness in contact with the surface. The convection coefficient may also be increased by an insert of a twisted tape that consists in a periodical twist through 360 degrees. Tangential inserts optimize the velocity of the flow near the tube wall, while providing a bigger heat transfer area. While, increased area and convection coefficient can be achieved by applying spiral fin or ribs inserts. Other aspects such pressure drop must be taken into consideration in order to meet the fan or pump power constraints.

Helically Coiled Tube

The coil spring insert may enhance heat transfer without turbulence or additional heat transfer surface area. A secondary flow is induces the fluid creating two longitudinal vortices. This could result, (in contrast to a right tube) in highly non-uniform local  around the periphery of the tube. Leading to a dependence of the local heat transfer coefficients on the different locations along the tube. Supposing that the conditions for the heat flux are constant, the mean fluid temperature,   can be estimated as follows,

    where    = constant.

Maximum fluid temperatures near the tube wall are present when the fluid is heated, and because the heat transfer coefficient is strongly depended of angle, the calculation of the maximum local temperature is not straight forward. For this purpose, correlations for the peripherally averaged Nusselt number are, if none, of little use when keeping heat flux conditions constant. On the other hand, correlations for the peripherally averaged Nusselt number for constant wall temperature are very useful.

The secondary flow:

	Increases heat transfer rates.
	Increases friction loses.
	Decreases entrance length.
	Reduces the difference between the laminar and turbulent heat transfer rates, in contrast to the straight tube case.
The coil pitch S has negligible influence on the pressure drop and the heat transfer rates. For the helical tube, the critical Reynolds number to the onset of turbulence is,

 

The delays on the transition from laminar to turbulent state are strongly dependent on strong secondary flows associated with tightly wound helically coiled tubes.

   where  . C is the outer diameter of the helical coil.

and

    for   

and

    where   

For cases where , there is available recommendations provided by Shah and Joshi. The heat transfer coefficient may be used in the equation for the Newton's law of cooling equation 
  
and can be evaluated from the correlation,

 where       and   

The correlations for the friction factor in turbulent state are based in limited data. Furthermore, augmentation created by the use of helically coiled tubes due to the secondary flow is usually employed only for situations where the flow is in the laminar state. In this state, the entrance length is 20% to 50% shorter in comparison with the straight tube. In the case of turbulent flow, the flow becomes fully developed during the first half-turn of the helically coiled tube. For this reason, the entrance region can be neglected in many engineering calculations.
If the liquid or gas is heated in a straight tube, the fluid that passes near the centerline, will exit the tube in a much shorter time and will always be cooler than the fluid passing near the wall.

References

Heat transfer